Hitu is an Austronesian language of the Central Malayo-Polynesian subgroup spoken on Ambon Island in eastern Indonesia, part of a dialect chain of Seram Island.

Hitu is the name of a village; each of the villages, Wakal, Morela, Mamala, Hitu, and Hila, are said to have their own dialect.

References

Central Maluku languages
Languages of Indonesia
Seram Island